Tucker Lee Melançon (born February 3, 1946) is a senior United States district judge of the United States District Court for the Western District of Louisiana.

Education and legal career 
Melancon graduated from Louisiana State University with a Bachelor of Science degree in 1968. He finished studies at Tulane Law School with a Juris Doctor in 1973. He was a managing partner at Melancon & Rabalais, private practice with his colleague, Rodney M. Rabalais, in Marksville, Louisiana, from 1973 to 1993.

Bar Admissions
 Louisiana, 1973
 United States District Court for the Eastern District of Louisiana, 1974
 United States Court of Appeals for the Fifth Circuit, 1979
 United States District Court for the Middle District of Louisiana, 1980
 United States District Court for the Western District of Louisiana, 1985
 United States Supreme Court, 1985

Federal judicial service 
On the unanimous recommendation of Louisiana U.S. Senators John Breaux and Bennett Johnston, Melancon was nominated by President Clinton on November 18, 1993, to a seat vacated by Tom Stagg as Stagg assumed senior status. Melancon was confirmed by the United States Senate on February 10, 1994, and received his commission the following day. He assumed senior status on February 14, 2009, due to a certified disability.

Notable cases 
Melancon has presided over a number of cases in his judicial tenure of fifteen years. He has heard a variety of trials, including class action, tax evasion, drug trafficking, cross burning, as well as issues where the First Amendment and Clean Water Act standards were at stake or being violated. However, his legacy might be his devotion to desegregation in public schools in the parishes which fall under his jurisdiction; St. Landry, Evangeline, and Franklin, among others.

He sentenced one Evangeline Parish board member to ten days of incarceration with three days suspension, as well as high fines for criminal contempt (or contempt of court) a charge to which the board member had pleaded guilty for attempting to manipulate a court-ordered employment process. One fine, US $3,000, was, according to Melancon, retribution for what he said was the board member's violation of the court's desegregation order. Melancon was cited in one Fifth Circuit decision as having been "heavy-handed" and tending towards "over management" in his dealings with the parish school boards on the desegregation issues

In November 2009, Melancon was a visiting judge presiding over cases relating to the Staten Island ferry disaster in New York City.

Cancer
Melancon was diagnosed with stage-three breast cancer in 2003. After undergoing a mastectomy, radiation therapy, and chemotherapy, the cancer went into remission but resurfaced three years later. His wife, Diana Moore, helped him carve out a raw foods diet they learned from the Hippocrates Health Institute in Palm Beach, Florida.

Quotes
 "Nothing is more sacred than the First Amendment... You don't change the standard just because it involves minors." He said these words in August 2000 during the Skate Zone trial in Iberia Parish.

Other roles

 Board Member, National Coalition for Cancer Survivorship
 President, Avoyelles Parish Bar Association (1977-1978)
 House of Delegates, Louisiana State Bar Association (1973-1975 and 1990-1994)
 Bar Association for the First and Fifth Federal Circuits
 Federal Bar Association (New Orleans chapter)
 Louisiana Bar Foundation
 American Judicature Society
 Member, American Inns of Court:
 Judge Fred Fudickar Chapter 
 Cross-Roads American Inn of Court of Alexandria-Pineville Chapter
 John M. Dube Chapter
 Louisiana Workers' Compensation Advisory Board (1990-1991)
 Committee to Study Backlog in the Courts of Appeal, First and Third Circuits, by appointment of the Louisiana Supreme Court, 1991
 American Trial Lawyers' Association
 President Advisory Board, Louisiana Trial Lawyers' Association

References

Further reading
 Burgess, Richard: "Federal judge plans Evangeline School Board investigation". Baton Rouge Advocate. September 17, 2005
 Burgess, Richard: "Family gets new cocaine case trial". Baton Rouge Advocate. September 1, 2006.

External links

 Bean, Alan: "Snitch Testimony on Trial". March 30, 2006
 Bean, Alan: "Dispatches from Cajun Hell". July 14, 2006
 Burgess, Richard: "Five Sentenced For Lying to Get Lawsuit Payments". November 17, 2006
 McElfresh, Amanda: "Family Cleared in Drug Case". December 16, 2006
 Louisiana Bar Foundation

Living people
1946 births
Tulane University Law School alumni
Judges of the United States District Court for the Western District of Louisiana
United States district court judges appointed by Bill Clinton
People from Bryan, Texas
20th-century American judges
21st-century American judges